Gian Piero Galeazzi (18 May 1946 – 12 November 2021), also known as Giampiero Galeazzi, was an Italian competition rower, sport journalist, commentator, and television personality.

Life and career 
Born in Rome, Galeazzi graduated in statistics, then he was a competition rower, becoming a junior world champion and participating in Mexico Olympics in 1968. He was hired by RAI as a sports journalist in 1972, and he was for years a commenter of rowing, tennis and soccer. In 1992 he started hosting the most important RAI sport program of the time, 90º minuto, and from 1994 he also proposed himself as an entertainer in the variety show Domenica in.

Galeazzi died on 12 November 2021, at the age of 75, due to complications from diabetes.

References

External links 
 

1946 births
2021 deaths
Rowers from Rome
Writers from Rome
Italian television personalities
Rowers at the 1968 Summer Olympics
Olympic rowers of Italy
Italian male rowers
Italian sports journalists
Italian sports commentators
Deaths from diabetes